One (stylized as ONE and previously known as Super One Television) is a television station in Malta owned by One Productions, the Labour Party's media arm. Broadcasts commenced in March 1994.

Studios
The station is administered and broadcasts from its studios in Marsa.

The station also has an Outside Broadcasting Unit, which it first used during the Malta Labour Party's May Day celebrations on 1 May 1997. One TV also won the first two editions of the Television Station of the year awards in 2006 & 2007.

External links
  

Television stations in Malta
Television channels and stations established in 1993
1993 establishments in Malta
Labour Party (Malta) publications
Marsa, Malta